Rank comparison chart of officers for air forces of Hispanophone states.

Officers

See also
Comparative air force officer ranks of the Americas
Ranks and insignia of NATO air forces officers

References

Military ranks of Hispanophone countries 
Military comparisons